Brodoa intestiniformis is a species of lichenized fungi within the Parmeliaceae family.

This species is present in arctic and northern boreal and alpine regions.

References

 Walt. Watson in Watson (1939) Trans. & Proc. Bot. Soc. Edinburgh, Vol.: 32 p. 504
 Goward (1987) Bryologist, Vol.: 89 Issue: 3 p. 222

Parmeliaceae
Lichen species
Lichens of the Arctic